German submarine U-951 was a Type VIIC U-boat of Nazi Germany's Kriegsmarine during World War II.

She was ordered on 10 April 1941, and was laid down on 31 January 1942 at Blohm & Voss, Hamburg, as yard number 151. She was launched on 14 October 1942 and commissioned under the command of Oberleutnant zur See Kurt Pressel on 3 December 1942.

Design
German Type VIIC submarines were preceded by the shorter Type VIIB submarines. U-951 had a displacement of  when at the surface and  while submerged. She had two shafts and two  propellers.

U-951 was fitted with five  torpedo tubes (four fitted at the bow and one at the stern), fourteen torpedoes or 26 TMA mines, one  SK C/35 naval gun, 220 rounds, and one twin  C/30 anti-aircraft gun. The boat had a complement of between 44 — 52 men.

Service history
On 7 July 1943, U-951 was sunk by depth charges, north-west of Cape St. Vincent in the North Atlantic, from a US B-24 Liberator of 1st A/S Squadron/K USAAF. Her crew of 46 were all lost.

Wolfpacks
U-951 took part in three wolfpacks, namely:
 Trutz (1 – 16 June 1943)
 Trutz 2 (16 – 29 June 1943)
 Geier 2 (30 June – 7 July 1943)

References

Bibliography

External links

German Type VIIC submarines
U-boats commissioned in 1942
World War II submarines of Germany
Ships built in Hamburg
1942 ships
Maritime incidents in July 1943
World War II shipwrecks in the Atlantic Ocean